The Canon O'Brien Cup is an annual hurling match contested by Cork and University College Cork. The match, usually played in January at the Mardyke Sports Ground, is often regarded as a pre-season warm-up game for the two participants.

Organised by the Cork County Board, admission to the match is free; however, those attending the game are asked to make a donation to volunteer collectors on the day, with all proceeds going to the Irish Alzheimer's Society. The fixture was first played in 2013.

The current holders (2020) are University College Cork.

History
The Canon O'Brien Cup was launched in 2013 by GAA President Liam O'Neill. The Cup was planned to be an annual challenge match between Cork and University College Cork. Canon Michael O'Brien, who was heavily involved as a coach with both teams, led UCC to eight consecutive Fitzgibbon Cup titles between 1981 and 1988 and led Cork to the 1990 All-Ireland title.

Cup
The cup was donated by the O’Brien family and is a replica of the Fitzgibbon Cup. It was presented to Canon O'Brien in 1983 by the UCC hurling squad after he had helped them to win three Fitzgibbon Cup titles in-a-row.

List of finals

Records

Scoring
All time top scorers

Top scorers in a single game

Miscellaneous
 Daniel Kearney of Cork holds the record for playing in five Canon O'Brien Cup-winning teams.
 Colm Spillane won Canon O'Brien Cup titles as a member of both the Cork (2013) and University College Cork (2017) teams.

References

Hurling cup competitions in Munster
Cork GAA
UCC GAA